Pseudocarorita is a monotypic genus of European sheet weavers containing the single species, Pseudocarorita thaleri. It was first described by J. Wunderlich in 1980, and has only been found in Central Europe.

See also
 List of Linyphiidae species (I–P)

References

Linyphiidae
Monotypic Araneomorphae genera